The western rock skink  (Trachylepis sulcata) is a species of skink found in Namibia, South Africa, and Angola.

References

Trachylepis
Reptiles described in 1867
Taxa named by Wilhelm Peters